Doctor Stites was a delegate to Mississippi's 1868 constitutional convention and a state legislator in Mississippi. He was a trustee of Alcorn University. He was a party to the dispute between new and old trustees after a changing of the guard.

He was one of about 17 African American delegates to Mississippi's 1868 constitutional convention, sixteen of them reported to have been from southern states.

He was accused of being paid off to relinquish a promised appointment as sheriff.

See also
African-American officeholders during and following the Reconstruction era

References

African-American state legislators in Mississippi
Members of constitutional conventions
Alcorn State University people
19th-century American politicians
Year of birth missing
Year of death missing